Conner Huertas del Pino (born 20 December 1995) is a Peruvian tennis player.

Huertas del Pino has a career high ATP singles ranking of 520 achieved on 1 August 2022. He also has a career high ATP doubles ranking of 239 achieved on 12 December 2022.

Huertas del Pino represents Peru at the Davis Cup, where he has a W/L record of 0–2.

Huertas del Pino is the younger brother of fellow tennis player Arklon Huertas del Pino.

ATP Challenger finals

Doubles

References

External links

1995 births
Living people
Peruvian male tennis players
Sportspeople from Lima
21st-century Peruvian people
Auburn Tigers men's tennis players